Premiers of Alberta by time served in office as of . The  premier always stays in office during an election campaign. That time is included in the total, even if the premier is defeated.

Notes

Alberta, premiers

Premiers
Alberta timelines